In the sport of cricket, a nightwatchman is a lower-order batsman who comes in to bat higher up the order than usual near the end of the day's play. The nightwatchman's job is to maintain most of the strike until the close of play (remaining in overnight after the end of the day's play, hence the name) and so protect other, more capable batsmen from being out cheaply in what may be a period of tiredness or in poor light at the end of the day, and then again the following morning when the batsmen have not yet ‘got their eye in', or when the early-morning conditions may favour the bowlers. The theory is that losing two top-order batsmen in quick succession would be worse than losing one top-order batsman and a tailender.

However the nightwatchman's effort is not considered to be wasted, nor are they expected to play foolishly; otherwise they would not last very long. The role of nightwatchman is generally given to players who emphasise defensive technique over quick run-scoring.  However, there have been occasions when nightwatchmen have made a big score, and six have made centuries in test matches. Generally speaking, the nightwatchman plays conservatively on the night, but the next day may be allowed a freer role to score runs.

The tactic has its drawbacks - if the nightwatchman gets out before the end of the day, the batting team may need to send out a more capable batsman to prevent the loss of further wickets, thereby costing the team a wicket while negating any benefit from using the nightwatchman; and even if the nightwatchman does survive until the end of the day, the beginning of the next day's play will see refreshed bowlers with better light facing a less capable batsman. As a result, not all captains use the tactic; Steve Waugh, for example, abandoned the tactic during his captaincy of Australia.

The nightwatchman is not to be confused with the pinch hitter, a middle to lower order batsman who is promoted up the order in limited-overs games, or in first-class games where their team is looking for a quick declaration, in the pursuit of quick runs without too much concern for their wicket.

Test centuries by nightwatchmen 

There have been six test centuries by nightwatchmen, as recognised by ESPNcricinfo:

There has been debate about whether Nasim-ul-Ghani (who later opened in a Test) and wicketkeeper Boucher were genuine nightwatchmen – however, in the matches in question they both came in at No. 6, at the end of the day, ahead of more recognised batsmen, and Cricinfo considers them to have been nightwatchmen.

Alex Tudor (of England) was close to making a century as a nightwatchman; he made 99 not out against New Zealand in 1999 at Edgbaston, and was stranded one run short of his maiden test century when Graham Thorpe got the total to the point where a boundary was needed for the win with Tudor being on 95 runs, needing a six to reach his century. Tudor then hit the winning runs with a four, leaving him on 99*.

Also close was Harold Larwood. In the final Test of the 1932–33 Ashes, Larwood made 98 as a nightwatchman, the highest innings made in the role up to that time.

References

External links
 The Nightwatchman in Test Cricket: A Follow-up Analysis – A review on the effectiveness of using nightwatchmen
 The Myth of the Nightwatchman – Statistical analysis aiming to debunk the concept of nightwatchman

Batting (cricket)
Cricket terminology